Akali Sahib Singh Kaladhari (1876-1942) was a Nihang Singh and 11th Jathedar of Shiromani Panth Akali Budha Dal.

References

Nihang
Indian Sikhs